In the 1987–88 season, USM Alger is competing in the National for the 17th time, as well as the Algerian Cup. They will be competing in National 1 and the Algerian Cup.

Summary season

On July 5, 1987 USK Alger celebrated its 50th anniversary and the opportunity to bring everyone together has not been seized. Many of these people did not participate in this celebration. From the founding father Sid Ahmed Kemmat to the sympathetic son like Boualem Rahma the Chaabi singer, However they forgot many faces that presented to the club that the reasons the party was not complete. After that the USM Alger's results fluctuated between ups and downs for a decade and in spite of that and in the 1987–88 season the club returned to the first division with a young squad, mostly from Reserve team under the leadership of coach and former captain of the team Djamel Keddou, and despite the lack of experience, USM Alger managed to win the Algerian Cup for the second time after winning against CR Belouizdad with penalties at Stade 5 Juillet 1962 which is the fourth final between the two teams and the first victory for USMA after three defeats, after the match Amar Kabrane was subjected to great criticism and was accused of deliberately wasting the penalty shootout, especially since he then moved to them, USM Alger guarantee the qualification card for the African Cup Winners Cup for the second time.

Squad list
Players and squad numbers last updated on 1 September 1987.Note: Flags indicate national team as has been defined under FIFA eligibility rules. Players may hold more than one non-FIFA nationality.

Competitions

Overview

Championnat National

League table

Results by round

Matches

Algerian Cup

Squad information

Playing statistics

|-

|-
! colspan=10 style=background:#dcdcdc; text-align:center| Players transferred out during the season

Goalscorers
Includes all competitive matches. The list is sorted alphabetically by surname when total goals are equal.

References

USM Alger seasons
Algerian football clubs 1987–88 season